Kuznetsky Most is a Moscow Metro station in the Meshchansky District, Central Administrative Okrug, Moscow. It is on the Tagansko-Krasnopresnenskaya Line. Designed by Nina Aleshin and N. Samoylova the station was the first column type to be built since the 1950s. It was opened in 1975 as part of the linking segment between the Zhdanovskaya and Krasnopresnenskaya Line. Decoratively the station is a column tri-vault. The columns are faced with "gazgan" marble archways (reminding one of a viaduct). The floor is covered with polarised black granite. The snow-white marble of the walls is decorated with decorative artworks created by M. Alekseyev. The vestibule of the station is located in the courtyard of Rozhdestvenka Street, 6. At the opposite end of the station is a transfer to the Lubyanka station on the Sokolnicheskaya Line.

Moscow Metro stations
Railway stations in Russia opened in 1975
Tagansko-Krasnopresnenskaya Line
Railway stations located underground in Russia